Alessandro Guevara (born 29 June 1974) is a Brazilian former professional tennis player.

Guevara, who comes from Rio de Janeiro, had career high rankings of 592 for singles and 211 for doubles, featuring mostly on the satellite and ITF Futures circuits. He made it to ATP Challenger level as a doubles player and won a tournament in Gramado in 2002.

Challenger/Futures titles

Singles

Doubles

References

External links
 
 

1974 births
Living people
Brazilian male tennis players
Sportspeople from Rio de Janeiro (city)
20th-century Brazilian people
21st-century Brazilian people